This is a list of episodes of Never Mind the Buzzcocks, the satirical music-based panel game. 

The show was originally chaired by Mark Lamarr, with Sean Hughes and Phill Jupitus as team captains and two guests on each team. Lamarr left after series 17 and series 18 was chaired by a series of guest hosts. One of these, satirical Popworld presenter Simon Amstell, took over as presenter from series 19. Amstell left after series 22 and the show was chaired by guests until the end of Series 27. For Series 28 the show was presented by Rhod Gilbert.

Bill Bailey replaced Sean Hughes from series 11. During series 21, Bailey was unable to attend filming and so Noel Fielding provided cover for three episodes (2, 3 and 4). Bailey left permanently after this series and was replaced by guest captains until Fielding returned full-time in series 23. Professor Green replaced Fielding as team captain for one episode in series 26 (episode 5). Phill Jupitus was unable to appear in one episode of series 25 (episode 6), the only episode of the show's original run he did not appear in (not including the 2011 Comic Relief episode for 24 Hour Panel People). His position on that occasion was taken by Frankie Boyle. In June 2013, an eight-part clip show series aired under the name What a Load of Buzzcocks. Each episode focussed on a different year of the show and the musical stories from that year. Alex James of Blur narrated all episodes of the series.

A twenty-ninth series aired in 2021, hosted by Greg Davies, with Noel Fielding and Daisy May Cooper as captains, and Jamali Maddix as a regular team member.

Series overview

Episodes
Guests are listed from the hosts' far right to far left. Numbers in square brackets after each list indicate that team's total score. The coloured backgrounds denote the result of each of the shows:
  – indicates Phill/Daisy's team won.
  – indicates Sean's/Bill's/the guest/Noel's team won.
  – indicates the game ended in a draw.

Series 1 (1996–97)

Series 2 (1997)

Series 3 (1998)

Series 4 (1998)

Never Rewind the Buzzcocks (1998)

Series 5 (1999)

Series 6 (1999–2000)

Series 7 (2000)

Series 8 (2001)

Series 9 (2001)

Series 10 (2002)

Series 11 (2002)

Series 12 (2003)

Series 13 (2003)

Series 14 (2004)

Series 15 (2004)

Series 16 (2005)

Series 17 (2005)

Series 18 (2006)

Series 19 (2006)

Series 20 (2007)

Series 21 (2007–08)

Series 22 (2008–09)

Series 23 (2009)

Series 24 (2010–11)

Comic Relief special (2011)

Series 25 (2011)

Children in Need special (2011)

Sport Relief special (2012)

Series 26 (2012)

What a Load of Buzzcocks (2013)

Series 27 (2013)

Series 28 (2014–15)

Series 29 (2021)
This was the first series of the show's revival on Sky Max.

Series 30 (2022)
A ten-episode series was announced in May 2022. Jamali was on Noel's team in every episode.

Scores

Footnotes

References

External links
 
 

Never Mind the Buzzcocks
Lists of British comedy television series episodes
Lists of British non-fiction television series episodes